Pageland is a town in Chesterfield County, South Carolina, United States. It is the second largest town in Chesterfield County. The population was 2,760 at the 2010 census.

It is known as "The Watermelon Capital of World" because of the importance of watermelons to the town and its economy.  The annual Pageland Watermelon Festival is held every July. Pageland's water tower features a watermelon on the tank.

Geography
Pageland is located in northwestern Chesterfield County at  (34.771272, -80.391630). U.S. Route 601 passes through the town, leading north  to Monroe, North Carolina, and southwest  to Kershaw. South Carolina Highway 9 leads east from Pageland  to Chesterfield and west  to Lancaster. South Carolina Highway 151 leads south  to Jefferson.

Neighboring towns 
Monroe, North Carolina – north
Mount Croghan, South Carolina – east
Jefferson, South Carolina – south
Lancaster, South Carolina – west

Major highways

Demographics

2020 census

As of the 2020 United States census, there were 2,456 people, 1,019 households, and 647 families residing in the town.

2000 census
As of the census of 2000, there were 2,521 people, 964 households, and 641 families residing in the town. The population density was 575.4 people per square mile (222.2/km2). There were 1,071 housing units at an average density of 244.4/sq mi (94.4/km2). The racial makeup of the town was 54.34% White, 35.82% African American, 0.24% Native American, 0.99% Asian, 0.04% Pacific Islander, 7.22% from other races, and 1.35% from two or more races. Hispanic or Latino of any race were 8.77% of the population.

There were 964 households, out of which 30.5% had children under the age of 18 living with them, 41.4% were married couples living together, 20.2% had a female householder with no husband present, and 33.5% were non-families. 28.7% of all households were made up of individuals, and 14.7% had someone living alone who was 65 years of age or older. The average household size was 2.54 and the average family size was 3.06.

In the town, the population was spread out, with 25.5% under the age of 18, 11.9% from 18 to 24, 28.0% from 25 to 44, 19.2% from 45 to 64, and 15.4% who were 65 years of age or older. The median age was 34 years. For every 100 females there were 92.9 males. For every 100 females age 18 and over, there were 88.9 males.

The median income for a household in the town was $29,046, and the median income for a family was $33,214. Males had a median income of $24,826 versus $18,452 for females. The per capita income for the town was $15,190. About 21.5% of families and 24.1% of the population were below the poverty line, including 37.2% of those under age 18 and 25.4% of those age 65 or over.

Politics 
In the South Carolina House of Representatives, Pageland is located in South Carolina's 53rd House district and is represented by Republican Richie Yow. In the South Carolina Senate, Pageland is located in Senate district 27 and represented by Penry Gustafson.

Education 
Public education in Pageland is administered by Chesterfield County School District. The district operates Petersburg Primary School, Pageland Elementary School, New Heights Middle School, and Central High School.

South Pointe Christian School, a private Christian school, operates in Pageland. It includes classes for preschool through high school.

Northeastern Technical College, part of the South Carolina Technical College System, has a branch in Pageland.

Pageland has a public library, a branch of the Chesterfield County Library System.

Local media
The local newspaper is The Progressive Journal, which is published weekly on Tuesdays.
Pageland also is covered by The Link, which is published weekly on Tuesday.

Notable people
 Billy Backus, world champion boxer, has lived there
 Robbie Caldwell, former head football coach at Vanderbilt University, current offensive line coach at Clemson University, grew up in Pageland
 Justice Cunningham, football player selected in the 2013 NFL Draft by the Indianapolis Colts and Mr. Irrelevant
 Brett Griffin, spotter in the NASCAR Cup Series, NASCAR Xfinity Series, NASCAR Gander RV & Outdoors Truck Series, and host of the Door, Bumper, Clear podcast for Dirty Mo' Media. 
 Corey Miller, football linebacker for the New York Giants
 Patina Miller, Tony Award-winning actress and singer, former student of Central High School in Pageland
 Van Lingle Mungo, baseball pitcher for the Major League Brooklyn Robins-Dodgers and New York Giants, also known for a song bearing his name

References

External links
 Town website
 Pageland Chamber of Commerce
 Chesterfield County School District

Towns in Chesterfield County, South Carolina